The tepui spinetail (Cranioleuca demissa) is a species of bird in the family Furnariidae.

It is found in Venezuela and adjacent areas of Roraima and Guyana. Its natural habitat is subtropical or tropical moist montane forests.

References

tepui spinetail
tepui spinetail
tepui spinetail
tepui spinetail
Taxonomy articles created by Polbot
Birds of the Tepuis